Count Zhuang of Quwo (died 716 BC), ancestral name Ji (姬), given name Shan (鱓), was the second ruler of the state of Quwo during the Spring and Autumn period. He was the son of Huan Shu of Quwo and half-brother of Wuzi of Han.

In 724 BC, Count Zhuang of Quwo killed Marquis Xiao of Jin in the capital of Jin, Yi (翼). Then, Jin troops attacked Zhuang Bo of Quwo so he retreated back to Quwo. The son of Marquis Xiao of Jin ascended the throne and became Marquis E of Jin.

According to the Records of the Grand Historian, in 718 BC, when Zhuang Bo of Quwo heard the news of the death of Marquis E of Jin, he brought troops to attack Jin. King Ping of Zhou ordered the Duke of Guo (虢公) to attack Zhuang Bo of Quwo, so Zhuang Bo of Quwo retreated back to Quwo. The Jin people asked the son of Marquis E of Jin, to ascend the throne and he became the next ruler of Jin: Marquis Ai of Jin.

The Zuo Zhuan has a different record of the event. It says that Zhuang Bo of Quwo had an alliance with the state of Zheng and the state of Xing (邢) and they attacked Yi (翼), the capital of Jin. King Huan of Zhou sent troops to help Quwo so Marquis E of Jin fled. Soon afterward Zhuang Bo of Quwo betrayed King Huan of Zhou and attacked him. King Huan of Zhou then sent the Duke of Guo (虢公) during the autumn of that year to attack Quwo and to put the son Gongzi Guang of Marquis E of Jin, on the throne of Jin and Gongzi Guang became Marquis Ai of Jin.

In 716 BC, Count Zhuang of Quwo died and his son Cheng ascended the throne of Quwo and became Duke Wu of Quwo.

Monarchs of Jin (Chinese state)
8th-century BC Chinese monarchs
716 BC deaths